Yasmine Mustafa (born 1982) is an American CEO, entrepreneur, and activist. She was born in Kuwait.

Early life 
Mustafa was born in Kuwait, located in the northwestern corner of the Persian Gulf, and lived there until she was eight years old. She was eight years old when the Gulf War began and was forced to evacuate with her family and moved to America. After coming to America, her younger brother was born.  The family settled in Philadelphia where Mustafa learned English and spent the rest of her childhood. 

Her first job was working in a 7-Eleven store owned by her father.

She got into tech when she was 24 and interned at a tech consultancy firm while in the entrepreneurship program at Temple University in Philadelphia. She worked her way up at the firm and was offered a job by the company owner, Skip Shuda, after she graduated from college. While working at this tech company, she got the idea for her first company—123LinkIt.

Professional life 
Mustafa attended Temple University part-time, financing her own education and graduating summa cum laude in 2006. In 2009, she started 123LinkIt, a company created to help writers make money off of their blogs. She also founded the Philadelphia chapter of Girl Develop It, a nonprofit organization that teaches web and software development to women.

In 2016, Mustafa was recognized in BBC's annual 100 Women series where the recognize significant achievements of women around the world.

Mustafa founded 123LinkIt in 2008 and is currently the CEO of the company.

Mustafa is the CEO and co-founder of ROAR for Good, which launched in 2015. Mustafa came up with the idea of ROAR for Good when she was 30 years old and traveling in Spanish countries for six months. While traveling, she was told horror stories about women who had been sexually assaulted or harassed, and when she returned from her trip, she found out her neighbor had been severely beaten and raped. These stories made her realize the prevalence of violence against women, and she wanted to do something about it.

After doing research and surveys, she and her team realized something needed to be made that could help someone getting attacked, but not be used against them. They came up with the idea for “Athena,” which looks nice enough for women to wear, deters attackers with an audible alert message, and notifies pre-selected contacts of the wearer's location when pressed.

Girl Develop It

The Philadelphia chapter of Girl Develop It (GDI) was also founded by Mustafa. She learned about GDI from Twitter and signed up and completed one of their courses. After finishing her course, she approached her course instructor (GDI’s founder) and talked to her about expanding. GDI was then brought to Philadelphia six months later thanks to Mustafa.

References 

Living people
American computer businesspeople
American technology chief executives
American women chief executives
Temple University alumni
Kuwaiti emigrants to the United States
BBC 100 Women
21st-century American women
1982 births